Samsung Galaxy A3 refers to three Samsung Galaxy Android smart phones released in the 2010s.

These are:
Samsung Galaxy A3 (2014); Android smartphone unveiled in October 2014, released in December 2014.
Samsung Galaxy A3 (2015); Android smartphone released in December 2015.
Samsung Galaxy A3 (2016); Android smartphone released in January 2016.
Samsung Galaxy A3 (2017); Android smartphone released in January 2017.
Samsung Galaxy A3 (2018); Android smartphone released in August 2018.

Samsung Galaxy